Pleaseeasaur (pronounced Please-ee-uh-saur) is an American comedic musical act made of JP Hasson (formerly in We’re Not From Idaho and Touch Me Zoo, both with Joe Genaro of The Dead Milkmen). The music is high energy camp style humor. The live performance usually includes Hasson in many costumes, each of which coincides with the song, along with multimedia animations of related images on a large screen. Many songs are commercials for fake companies such as "No Prob Limo", "Pizza Brothers and Sons, Inc." and "Action City News."

Eventually garnering the attention of executives at Comedy Central, who in 2006 released what was essentially a greatest hits CD/DVD titled The Amazing Adventures of Pleaseeasaur featuring music videos directed by artist TH3 and a cartoon adventure, animated by the team from the Adult Swim series Sealab 2021 and Frisky Dingo.

Pleaseeasaur toured internationally during its 12 years, most often with alternative comedian Neil Hamburger as well as with such notable acts as: The Black Heart Procession, Boredoms, Buckethead, Man or Astro-Man?, The Melvins, Pinback, The Presidents of the United States of America as well as others.

Pleaseeasaur disbanded in 2009. Hasson is now touring internationally in support of his new project, JP Incorporated, for which there is a new album titled An Album of Distinction, released by Comedy Central consisting of 24 fictitious TV theme songs.

Discography

DVDs
 The Amazing Adventures Of Pleaseeasaur (DVD) Comedy Central (2006)
 Action Spectacular (DVD) imputor? Records (2005)

Albums
 The Amazing Adventures Of Pleaseeasaur (CD) Comedy Central (2006)
 The Yellow Pages imputor? Records (2004)
 Pleaseeasaur Int'l Airport V8 Records Australia (2003)
 As Seen On TV  imputor? Records (1999)
 Faites Fondre Le Chardon Trezieme (self-released cassette) (1995)

EPs
 Neil Hamburger/Pleaseeasaur - "Souvenir Record" (tour only 7" with cover art by Mark Mothersbaugh) Million Dollar Performances (2008)
 Beef Flavored Island Razler Records (2001)

External links
  J.P. Hasson's Official Website
 Official website
 Pleaseeasaur Page at Comedy Central
 Pleaseeasaur page @ imputor?
 Pleaseeasaur @ Last.fm

American comedy musical groups